Al-Baath University, founded in 1979, is a public university located in the city of Homs, Syria, 180 km north of Damascus. It is Syria's fourth largest university.

History 
The university was established in 1979; it was established by Presidential Decree No. 44 issued by Hafez al-Assad.

Al-Baath University has 22 faculties, 5 intermediate institutes, 40,000 regular students, 20,000 students in open learning, 1310 high studies students and 622 faculty members. The library contains some 63,000 volumes (as of 2011).

Gallery

See also
Faculty of Medicine of Al-Baath University

References

External links
Official website (Arabic)
Syrian Physical Therapy community (syriaPT.com) (Arabic)
Open education in Al-Baath university (Arabic)

 
Baath
Education in Homs
Buildings and structures in Homs
Educational institutions established in 1979
1979 establishments in Syria